Albon is a surname. Notable people with the surname include:

Alan Albon (1921–1989), British anarchist and publisher
Alex Albon (born 1996), Thai racing driver
Lee Albon (born 1959), Australian cricketer
Mark Albon (born 1969), British racing driver
Nigel Albon, British racing driver
Teodora Albon (born 1977), Romanian football referee